Hamborn is a district of the city of Duisburg, in North Rhine-Westphalia (Germany).
Hamborn has a population of 71,528 an area of 20.84 km2. Since 1 January 1975,  has been one of seven districts or boroughs (Stadtbezirk) of Duisburg.

History
The city of Hamborn was incorporated into Duisburg in 1929. Until the merger, Hamborn was an independent city and at that time was one of the 40 largest cities in Germany.

Earliest mention of Hamborn is around 962AD as Havenburn, meaning Cattle trough. The land was given to the Archbishop of Cologne, to build a Premonstratensian monastery in 1136 by count Gerhard von Hochstaden. The Abbey and the neighboring farming communities were part of the Duchy of Cleves and became in 1666AD part of Brandenburg, Prussia.  Until the early 19th century Hamborn was still a small village.

Climate

Landmarks
Landmarks in Hamborn include:
 
 Hamborn Abbey (Abtei Hamborn), Hamborn, Duisburg: Premonstratensian Canons 1136–1802, 1959-today
 Botanischer Garten Duisburg-Hamborn (Botanical Gardens)

Notable people
 Manfred Adamski (1947–2005), Chairman of the König-Brauerei, Chairman of MSV Duisburg
 Jacques Berndorf (born 1936) (actually Michael Preute), journalist and writer
 Hanns-Heinz Bielefeld (born 1918), politician
 Albert Thomas Dölken (born 1960), Abbot of Hamborn
 Clemens Dölken (born 1956), Roman Catholic priest
 Tadeusz Gwiazdowski (1918–1983), Polish actor
 Walter Hellmich (born 1944), football functionaries and Contractors
 Ludger Horstkötter (born 1939), Roman Catholic priest and historian
 Fritz Ketz (1903–1983), painter and graphic artist
 Ernst Kozub (1924–1971), heroic tenor
 Karl A. Lamers (born 1951), CDU member of the Bundestag
 Sören Link (born 1976), SPD member of parliament, mayor of Duisburg
 Daniel Morian (1811–1887), mining entrepreneur and alderman
 Johannes Pflug (born 1946), SPD member of the Bundestag
 Frithjof Elmo Porsch (born 1924), writer
 Werner Scholz (1944), soccer players and coaches
 Hanns Heinrich Schumacher (born 1948), diplomat and ambassador
 Rudolf Stampfuß (1904–1978), prehistorians
 Karl Heinz Stroux (1908–1985), actor, director and theater director
 Heinz Trökes (1913–1997), painter and graphic artist
 Sabine Weiss (born 1958), Mayor of Dinslaken and parliamentarian
 Ursula Woelfel (1922–2014), children's book author
 Rini van Woerden (1934–2004), Dutch footballer
 Paul Zielinski (1911–1966), football player, World Cup finalists in Italy in 1934

References 

Duisburg